Archbishop Alexander (Demoglou) of America (born 1876 - died 1942) was the first Greek Orthodox Archbishop of America, from 1922 to 1930.

Born at Chalcedon (now Kadıköy) in 1876, Alexander was ordained deacon in 1895 and priest in 1902.  He received episcopal ordination in 1917 and went to North America in 1918.  

In America, he served first initially as synodical vicar of the proto-archdiocese of North and South America, under the jurisdiction of Meletius (Metaxakis) of Athens.

Meletius (as Meletius IV of Constantinople was briefly (1921 to 1923) Patriarch of Constantinople and one of his actions as Patriarch was to appoint Alexander as Archbishop for all of America (North America and South America). 

Alexander served as Archbishop of America until 1930, at which time the Patriarch moved him to be Archbishop of Corfu, where he continued to his death in 1942.  

Alexander is credited as having saved 23 high school students from execution when the military commander of the Ionian Islands condemned them to death as a result of their involvement in actions against Mussolini. 

Alexander was succeeded as Archbishop of America by Athenagoras who served until his election as Patriarch of Constantinople in 1948.

References 

Archbishops of the Greek Orthodox Archdiocese of America
Year of death missing
20th-century Eastern Orthodox archbishops
Greek Orthodox Archdiocese of America
1876 births
1942 deaths